Ruth Corman Rudy (born January 3, 1938) is a former Democratic member of the Pennsylvania House of Representatives.

References

Democratic Party members of the Pennsylvania House of Representatives
Women state legislators in Pennsylvania
Living people
1938 births
21st-century American women